The 1996–97 Midland Football Combination season was the 60th in the history of Midland Football Combination, a football competition in England.

Premier Division

The Premier Division featured 15 clubs which competed in the division last season, along with five new clubs:
Bilston Community College, promoted from Division One
Bolehall Swifts, relegated from the Midland Football Alliance
Kenilworth Town, promoted from Division One
Richmond Swifts, promoted from Division One
Worcester Athletico

Also, Ansells was renamed David Lloyd, and Alvechurch Villa was renamed Alvechurch.

League table

References

1996–97
9